Jiří Pecka (6 October 1940 – 2021) was a Czechoslovak cyclist. He competed in the 1000m time trial and team pursuit events at the 1964 Summer Olympics.

References

1940 births
2021 deaths
Czech male cyclists
Olympic cyclists of Czechoslovakia
Cyclists at the 1964 Summer Olympics
Sportspeople from Brno